Binapani Mohanty (11 November 1936 – 24 April 2022) was an Indian Odia language writer and academician. She was well known for her works such as Patadei and Kasturi Mriga. She was a professor in economics before retiring. She had been awarded Padmashree by the Government of India and Atibadi Jagannatha Das Sammana by Odisha Sahitya Akademi. She had earlier won the Sahitya Akademi Award and Sarala Award. She had served as chairperson of Odisha Lekhika Sansad.

Early life and professional career
Binapani was born to Chaturbhuja Mohanty and Kumudini Mohanty. Her family was from a village near Kendrapada called Chandol (then part of the undivided Cuttack district). However her father was a government servant and was posted at Berhampore where she was born in the year 1936. She completed her matriculation in 1953 and then went on to study economics. She got her bachelor's degree in 1957 and post graduation degree in 1959 from Ravenshaw college, Cuttack. She later worked as a lecturer and was posted to various colleges. She retired from Sailabala  Women's College in 1992.

Literary career
Binapani Mohanty has carved a niche for herself in the field of Odia fiction writing. Her literary career as a story-teller began with the publication of ‘Gotie Ratira Kahani’ in 1960. Some of her best known stories are Pata Dei, Khela Ghara, Naiku Rasta, Bastraharana, Andhakarara, Kasturi Murga O Sabuja Aranya and Michhi Michhika. It was the collection of short stories entitled 'Pata 
Dei and other Stories', that won the 1990 Sahitya Akademi. She was awarded the Padma Shri in 2020.

Her short story Pata Dei was published as Lata in Femina in 1986. In 1987, its Hindi dramatisation was telecast in Doordarshan as a series called  Kashmakash.

Many short stories of Binapani Mohanty have been translated into different languages such as English, Hindi, Kannada, Malayalam, Marathi, Bengali, Urdu, Telugu and Russian. A film was made on her story " Andhakarara Chhai" and has been highly appreciated by the audience.

She has also penned three novels: Sitara Sonita, Manaswini and Kunti, Kuntala, Shakuntala and a one-act play entitled Kranti. She has translated Russian folk-tales from English to Odia, among other translations.

Awards
She has won numerous awards including Padmashree. Few of them are noted below. 
 Sunday Prajatantra Award For Poetry (1956)
 Jhankar for poetry (1961 )
 Orissa Sahitya Academy Award for the short story collection titled Kasruri Mruga O Sabuja Aranya (1968)
 Jibanranga Award for short story (1973)
 Challapatha Award for short story (1973)
 Jhankar Award for short story by Prajatantra Prachar Samiti (1974) 
 Dharitri Award for short story (1980)
 Sahakar Award for short story (1985)
 Nilasaila Award for short(1987)
 Sucharita Award for short story (1988)
 Sahitya Akademi Award (1990)
 Sudhanya Award for short story (1992)
 Gokarnica Award (1999)
 Visuba Puraskar (2000)
 Sahitya Bharati Puraskar (2002)
 Gruhini Samaj Puraskar (2002)
 Bharat Chandra Sahitya Smruti Samman of Sambalpur University (2002)
 Pratham Reba Roy Samman (2004)
 Kadambini Samman (2009) 
 Uttar Orissa Sahitya Samman (2010)

Bibliography

Novels
 Sitara Sonita 
 Manaswini 
 Kunti, Kuntala, Shakuntala

Short Story
 Kasturi Mruga o Sabuja Aranya
 Kalantara 
Tatinira Trushna 
 Bastra Harana
 Arohana 
 Abhinetri 
Ekaki Parasara 
Ashru Anala 
 Sakunira Chaka 
 Khela Chalichi 
 Anya Aranya
Sayahnara svara : galpaguccha 
 Barsha, barsha, Bharatabarsha 
Apahanca Akasha  
 Andhakarara Chhai 
 Padma ghunchi ghunchi jauchi
Patadei

Autobiography/Biography
 Bitijaithiba Dina 
Kabi Bidyutprabha

Editor
Odia lekhika : Uttar-madhya parba
 Ama samayara galpa 
 Bhumi : kabita sankalana, 98-99

References

1936 births
2022 deaths
People from Cuttack district
Odia-language writers
Odia short story writers
Indian women short story writers
Recipients of the Sahitya Akademi Award in Odia
Recipients of the Padma Shri in literature & education
Recipients of the Atibadi Jagannath Das Award
Recipients of the Odisha Sahitya Akademi Award
Women writers from Odisha